Haggerston may refer to:

 Haggerston, Northumberland, village
Haggerston Castle, castle at Haggerston, Northumberland, England
Haggerston Baronets
 Haggerston, place in the London Borough of Hackney
 Haggerston (ward), ward in the London Borough of Hackney
 Haggerston (UK Parliament constituency), former borough constituency centred on the Haggerston district of the Metropolitan Borough of Shoreditch in London
 Haggerston Island, island in Queensland, Australia